The British documentary series Chartjackers ran for a single season of eleven weekly episodes during the autumn of 2009. The series documents the lives of four teenage video bloggers—Alex Day, Johnny Haggart, Jimmy Hill, and Charlie McDonnell—from the video-sharing website YouTube as they attempt to write, record and release a pop song by crowdsourcing through social media in ten weeks. When initially aired, the first ten episodes of Chartjackers, each five minutes in length, detailed the events of the previous seven days. The final episode, broadcast on 21 November 2009, compiled highlights from the previous ten weeks into one 30-minute episode, which was narrated by British DJ MistaJam. All eleven episodes were produced by Adam King and Jonathan Davenport of the production company Hat Trick Productions.

Chartjackers was devised in 2009 by Davenport and Andy Mettam of Hat Trick Productions, and was commissioned for development by Geoffrey Goodwin and Jo Twist of BBC Switch. Alongside the programmes Off the Hook and The Cut, it was featured as part of a season of multi-platform content designed to appeal to teenagers. The show was also directly linked to the 2009 annual appeal for the British charity Children in Need – profits from sales of the completed pop song were donated to the charity. Chartjackers aired weekly at approximately 1:10 p.m. on Saturday afternoons on BBC Two, with the first episode premiering on 12 September 2009 during the channel's two-hour long BBC Switch segment. The series garnered a viewing figures peak of almost half a million with its final episode and was critically panned by reviewers. Each episode was streamed online through BBC iPlayer to UK residents for seven days after its initial airing. The series was not broadcast outside the UK and, is not available to buy on DVD.

As a cross-platform project, Chartjackers was distributed both on television and through alternative media – as well as being streamed online through BBC iPlayer, each episode was also uploaded to the YouTube channel BBCSwitch the same day that it was broadcast on TV. In conjunction with the television episodes, video blogs featuring the four teenagers were uploaded to both the YouTube channels BBCSwitch and ChartJackersProject. Viewers were also able to subscribe to a dedicated Twitter channel, which kept them updated on the progress of the project. Creative content for these online platforms was provided by digital agency Fish in a bottle. Speaking in February 2010, Twist remarked that the use of these online networks during Chartjackers meant that the series had been able to extend social viewing and "connect with [its] audience". She also named the project as one in which she was proudest of being involved.

Episodes

References

External links
Chartjackers on BBC

Episode list at BBC Programmes

Episodes
Chartjackers
Chartjackers